Chapter 11:Accountability.  Chapter 11 of the 1997 Constitution of Fiji is titled Accountability.  Its 19 sections, divided into 5 parts, include a code of conduct expected of all government officers and employees, and establish a number of constitutional offices.

Part 1: Code of Conduct 

Part 1 of Chapter 11 establishes a code of conduct that applies to all constitutional officers and government employees.  It comprises just one section: Section 156.

Political leaders and civil servants are forbidden to engage in activities that entail, or could be seen to entail, a conflict of interest between their private interests and public duties, or that would compromise "fair exercise" of their public responsibilities.  They are forbidden to use their offices for private gain, or to allow their own integrity or that of the government to be called into question.  Parliament is empowered to legislate to enforce these regulations.

Part 2: Ombudsman 

Part 2 of Chapter 11 establishes the office of Ombudsman.  It comprises sections 157 through 164 of the constitution.

Section 157 stipulates that there must be at least one Ombudsman.  Parliament is empowered to appoint more than one, and if so, one of them shall be designated the Chief Ombudsman, who shall be in charge of the staffing of the Ombudsman's office and of the allocation of work amongst the Ombudsmen.

Section 158 sets out the Ombudsman's functions. The Ombudsman must investigate administrative complaints brought by government departments or parliamentary committees.  Complaints to the Ombudsman may also be made by any person whose interests are affected by an action of any government agency.  Complaints to the Ombudsman must be made in person, not through another party, but the Ombudsman may waive this rule if satisfied the person concerned is unable to make the complaint in person.

The Ombudsman is not authorized to investigate actions taken by a Cabinet Minister, judge, or any person with respect to that person's appointment to, or dismissal from, public office, or that person's pension entitlement.  The proceedings of the Ombudsman are not to be challenged in any court of law.

Sections 159 and 160 empower the Ombudsman to choose not to investigate a complaint brought to them, or to discontinue an investigation at any time.  Moreover, the Ombudsman is not generally authorized to hear complaints that could be reviewed by a court or tribunal, except when they involve breaches of the Bill of Rights.  Parliament is authorized to legislate to regulate the conduct of the Ombudsman's business.

Sections 161 and 162 deal with the outcome of the Ombudsman's investigations into complaints.  If the Ombudsman finds an action to have been unconstitutional, illegal, unreasonable, unjust, oppressive, or improperly discriminatory, they make a report, with copies to the Prime Minister and the Minister of the relevant department, with specifics as to what wrong or wrongs were committed, and what steps will rectify the wrongs.  After presenting the report to the Prime Minister and the Minister concerned, if no action is taken in a reasonable time, the Ombudsman may present a further report to the House of Representatives and the Senate.

Section 164 specifies the manner of the Ombudsman's appointment, and the limitations of the office.  Following consultation with the Prime Minister, the Constitutional Offices Commission appoints the Ombudsman, who must not hold or derive income from any other public office (except the chairmanship of the Human Rights Commission.  Nor may the Ombudsman, except with written permission from the Prime Minister, hold any other paid office or engage in any other paid occupation during their term as Ombudsman.  This safeguards the independence of the office, and prevents conflict of interest.

Section 164 requires the Ombudsman to publish an annual report, and specifies the contents.  In particular, investigations involving the police and the Fiji Prisons Service are to be documented.

Part 3:  Auditor-General 
Part 3 of Chapter 11 establishes the office of the Auditor-General.  It comprises sections 166 through 169.

Sections 166 and 167 establish the Auditor-General's office, and define its powers and duties.  The Auditor-General is the chief official accountant of the state.  They must make an annual inspection and audit, followed by a report to the Parliament, on all transactions concerning public money or public property.  The Auditor-General is to investigate the legality of all such transactions.  Nevertheless, provision exists for the Parliament to exempt a specified body corporate from audit by the Auditor-General. The report is to be delivered to the Speaker of the House of Representatives, and a copy given to the relevant Minister.  The Speaker is to require the report to be laid before the House and the Senate within 30 days of receiving it, or, if Parliament is not sitting at the time, on the first sitting day when it resumes.

Section 168 stipulates that the Auditor-General is to be appointed by the Constitutional Offices Commission following consultation with the relevant committee of the House of Representatives.  In the event of a vacancy, or of the Auditor-General being unable for any reason to exercise their duties, the Commission may, following consultation with the relevant Minister, appoint an acting Auditor-General.  The substitute position may be either permanent or temporary.

Part 4: General Provisions Relating to Certain Constitutional Offices 

Part 4 of Chapter 11 makes general provisions relating to certain constitutional offices.  It comprises sections 169 through 173 of the Constitution.

Sections 169 through 171 identify the officers to whom the provisions apply, and set out the terms and conditions for holding office.

The Supervisor of Elections, the Ombudsman, the Auditor General, the Director of Public Prosecutions, the Secretary-General to Parliament, and the Commissioner of Police are appointed for 5-year terms, and are eligible for reappointment.  Notwithstanding the term limit, all terms of office expire at age 65, after which officers are not eligible for further reappointment.  Salaries of all these officers are fixed by the Parliament, and may not be reduced during their terms.  In the case of alleged misbehavior or inability to perform the duties of the office, the President appoints a tribunal of at least 3 members, at least 2 of whom hold or have held high judicial office in Fiji or another country prescribed by the Parliament.  The tribunal investigates allegations and delivers recommendations to the government.  The President may then suspend or dismiss the officer, if recommended by the tribunal, on the advice of the Prime Minister, who is required to consult the Leader of the Opposition.

Members of the Human Rights Commission, the Constituency Boundaries Commission, the Electoral Commission, the Parliamentary Emoluments Commission, the Commission on the Prerogative of Mercy, the Constitutional Offices Commission, and the Disciplined Services Commission are appointed for 2-year terms; they may be reappointed for one further 2-year term, but are not eligible for further reappointment.  In the case of alleged misbehavior or of inability to perform duties of office, the Constitutional Offices Commission appoints a tribunal of at least 3 members, at least 2 of whom hold or have held high judicial office in Fiji or another country prescribed by the Parliament.  The tribunal investigates allegations and delivers recommendations to the government.

Section 173 sets out various regulations governing the functions of commissions and tribunals.  Decisions are taken by majority vote; in the event of a tie, the Chairman has a casting vote.

Part 5: Freedom of Information 
Part 5 of Chapter 11 consists of a single section, section 174, requiring the Parliament to legislate to give members of the public access rights to official documents of the government and its agencies.

1997 Constitution of Fiji